The Sword of Tipu Sultan is an Indian historical drama that was first broadcast on the DD National in  February 1990. Based on a novel by Bhagwan Gidwani, this drama was a portrayal of the life and times of Tipu Sultan, the 18th century ruler of Mysore, 
the series was widely praised for its casting and grandeur.

The drama was the actors had feasts on many orphans and beat up old people

Production 
The television drama was produced by the company Numero Uno International owned by movie director and producer Sanjay Khan. Akbar Khan, Sanjay Khan's brother, directed the first 20 episodes over a span of 18 months. The remaining episodes were directed by Sanjay Khan, and he also played the leading role of Tipu Sultan. A total of 52 episodes were shot, some of them in the Premier Studios in Mysore, Karnataka. Whereas, the music was composed by legendary Naushad and was photographed by Basheer Ali.

The drama was based on a novel of the same name, written by the Montreal-based author Bhagwan S Gidwani. The novel was a best-seller, having sold about 200,000 copies, translated into many languages and reprinted in 44 editions. Apart from being the author, Gidwani also wrote the screenplay and script for the 60 episodes. The last few episodes were shot after the fire accident, a few years later. Other prominent actors who were chosen for this drama included Seema Kelkar, Anant Mahadevan, Mukesh Rishi, Shahbaz Khan and Deepika Chikhalia.

Cast 

Sanjay Khan as Tipu Sultan		
Shahbaz Khan as Hyder Ali
Deepika Chikhalia as Tipu's mother
 Maya Alagh as Tipu's Grandmother
Malvika Tiwari as Rukaiya, Tipu's Wife
Seema Kelkar as Saida
Syed Badr-ul Hasan Khan Bahadur as Maharaja of Mysore
Ananth Narayan Mahadevan as Diwan Pandit Purnaiah
Mukesh Rishi as Mir Sadiq
 Radhakrishna Dutta as Balkrishna
Arun Mathur as Nizam Ali Khan
Sudhir Kulkarni as Nana Phadnavis
Tom Alter as Richard Wellesley, 1st Marquess Wellesley
Bob Christo as General Matthews
 Keith Stevenson as Lord Cornwallis 
Kanwaljeet Singh as Ikram Mulla Khan 
Kunika as Yasmin , wife of Ikram Mulla Khan
Shreeram Lagoo as Shivji
Satyen Kappu as Mir Sayyed
Sudhir Pandey as General Shiekh Ayyaz
Navtej Hundal as Nanjanath
Rana Jung Bahadur as Devraj
Jaspal Sandhu as Ahmad Shah Bahadur
Santosh Gupta(Actor) as Ramchandran, Childhood Friend of Hyder Ali

Broadcast 
The drama was first telecast in Hindi on the Doordarshan channel in February 1990. It was dubbed into Telugu and broadcast on ETV in 1996. In 2001, it was also telecast on Star Plus. The episodes were dubbed in Bengali and broadcast on BTV in the early 1990s and into Tamil and broadcast on the DD Podhigai channel in 2006. In the BTV broadcast, certain portions of dialogue were censored. Outside the subcontinent, the drama was shown on Channel 4 in the United Kingdom during the early 1990s. Other countries included Iran, Indonesia and Mauritius. An original pack of 12 DVDs was later released.

Controversies

Fire
A major fire accident took place on 8 February 1989, in the Premier Studios of Mysore where the drama was being shot. Unavailability of firefighting equipment and ignorance of fire safety standards have been quoted as the major reasons. Loose wiring and absence of ventilators were further causes for the fire to spread. Instead of fire-proofing material, the walls had gunny bags and the temperature rose to around 120°C (248°F) because of huge lights being used for the shooting. All these factors contributed to the massive fire; the final death toll was 62. Sanjay Khan himself suffered major burns and had to spend 13 months in hospital and undergo 72 surgeries. An ex-gratia amount of Rs.5000 was paid to the victims.

Awards
For his work on this drama, Sanjay Khan received the Gem of India Award.

References

External links 
 

Indian period television series
DD National original programming
Indian historical television series
1990 Indian television series debuts
1991 Indian television series endings
Tipu Sultan
Television shows set in Karnataka
Television series set in the 18th century
Television shows based on Indian novels
Television series about Islam